Hypocrita wingerteri is a moth of the family Erebidae. It was described by Vincent in 2004. It is found in Peru.

References

Hypocrita
Moths described in 2004